EPRU Stadium, also known by its original name of Boet Erasmus Stadium, was a stadium in Port Elizabeth, South Africa. The letters "EPRU" in the name represent the Eastern Province Rugby Union,  the stadium's historic primary tenants, whose team is now known as the Mighty Elephants. The original name Boet Erasmus Stadium was named after Boet Erasmus, a former mayor of Port Elizabeth. The stadium held a capacity of 33,852 people and served primarily as a venue for rugby union matches but also hosted a number of association football (soccer) fixtures.

Background

Music
On 6 March 2007, Irish vocal pop band Westlife held a concert for The Love Tour supporting their album The Love Album.

Rugby

Boet Erasmus stadium was primarily used as the home of rugby in the Eastern Cape. Situated in the affluent suburb of Summerstrand, it hosted matches at Test, Super Rugby, Currie Cup, Vodacom Cup and club level. It was regularly used by the Eastern Province Elephants under their previous names, the Mighty Elephants and the Eastern Province Kings and hosted their two home matches during the 1994 Super 10 season. The stadium was also the intended home of the Southern Spears, a team that was scheduled to play in the 2006 Currie Cup in preparation for its admission to the Super Rugby starting in 2007. However, the Spears were later denied entry into both competitions.

The stadium is credited for being the first stomping ground of a number of Springbok legends, included in which are Danie Gerber, Garth Wright, Frans Erasmus and Hannes Marias.

The Battle of Boet Erasmus
In 1974, during the 1974 British Lions tour to South Africa, one of the most violent matches in rugby history was dubbed the "Battle of Boet Erasmus Stadium".  After a 99 call by Lions, there is famous video footage of J.P.R. Williams running over half of the pitch and launching himself at Moaner van Heerden, something that Williams says he is not proud of. Gordon Brown hit his opposite number, Johan de Bruyn, so hard that the Orange Free State man's glass eye flew out and landed in the mud. 

At the 1995 Rugby World Cup on 3 June 1995, South Africa took on Canada in a clash that has also sometimes been dubbed the Battle of Boet Erasmus. The match, which South Africa ultimately won 20-0, was marred by an on-field scuffle with four players involved in a brawl. South Africa hooker James Dalton, who had come to the aid of a teammate who had been struck on the back of the head, and winger Pieter Hendriks were suspended for the remainder of the tournament for their roles in the incident and could only watch from the sidelines as the nation went on to claim its first Rugby World Cup title.

Soccer
The stadium was used as the home ground for Port Elizabeth's, Bay United F.C. who moved to the stadium for their 2008/2009 season in the Premier Soccer League. The club used the stadium again at times during their 2009/2010 campaign in the National First Division. This was due to availability problems with their preferred home ground, the Westbourne Oval.

Closure and abandonment

The stadium was officially closed in July 2010. The Eastern Province Rugby Union has moved all games to the new world class Nelson Mandela Bay Stadium in Port Elizabeth. The last match to be played at the stadium was a friendly against the Blue Bulls on 3 July 2010. The Boet hosted age-group, amateur and club rugby matches after being officially closed but has since been abandoned, with vagrants and thieves having slowly dismantled the stadium to such an extent that all that remains are the concrete structures. The local municipality, who own the property, has asked for proposals from the private sector for the redevelopment of the land.

The stadium was demolished in 2019.

International tournaments

1995 Rugby World Cup

The stadium was one of 9 venues throughout South Africa used for the Rugby World Cup. The stadium was used for group games in Group A. It hosted 3 games, including the match between South Africa and Canada:

1996 African Cup of Nations

When the tournament was moved to South Africa, the EPRU Stadium was chosen as one of 4 host stadiums. A total of 6 pool games were played at the stadium, as well as a quarter-final:

2010 FIFA World Cup

During the 2010 FIFA World Cup, the stadium was used as a logistics point for Port Elizabeth, a host city.

International matches

Rugby

Football

See also
 Nelson Mandela Bay Stadium
 List of stadiums in South Africa
 List of African stadiums by capacity

References

External links
Photos of Stadiums in South Africa at cafe.daum.net/stade

Soccer venues in South Africa
Rugby union stadiums in South Africa
Rugby World Cup stadiums
Buildings and structures in Port Elizabeth
Sport in Port Elizabeth
Sports venues in the Eastern Cape
Sports venues demolished in 2019
Demolished buildings and structures in South Africa